Heliophysics (from the prefix "helio", from Attic Greek hḗlios, meaning Sun, and the noun "physics": the science of matter and energy and their interactions) is the physics of the Sun and its connection with the Solar System. NASA defines  heliophysics as "(1) the comprehensive new term for the science of the Sun - Solar System Connection, (2) the exploration, discovery, and understanding of Earth's space environment, and (3) the system science that unites all of the linked phenomena in the region of the cosmos influenced by a star like our Sun."

Heliophysics concentrates on the Sun's effects on Earth and other bodies within the Solar System, as well as the changing conditions in space. It is primarily concerned with the magnetosphere, ionosphere, thermosphere, mesosphere, and upper atmosphere of the Earth and other planets. Heliophysics combines the science of the Sun, corona, heliosphere and geospace, and encompasses a wide variety of astronomical phenomena, including "cosmic rays and particle acceleration, space weather and radiation, dust and magnetic reconnection, nuclear energy generation and internal solar dynamics, solar activity and stellar magnetic fields, aeronomy and space plasmas, magnetic fields and global change", and the interactions of the Solar System with the Milky Way Galaxy.

Term “heliophysics” (Russian: “гелиофизика”) was widely used in Russian-language scientific literature. The Great Soviet Encyclopedia third edition (1969—1978) defines “Heliophysics” as “[…] a division of astrophysics  that studies physics of the Sun". In 1990, the Higher Attestation Commission, responsible for the advanced academic  degrees in Soviet Union and later in Russia and the Former Soviet Union, established a new specialty “Heliophysics and physics of solar system”. In English-language scientific literature prior to about 2002, the term heliophysics was sporadically used to describe the study of the "physics of the Sun". As such it was a direct translation from the French "héliophysique" and the Russian "гелиофизика". Around 2002, Joseph M. Davila and Barbara J. Thompson at NASA's Goddard Space Flight Center adopted the term in their preparations of what became known as the International Heliophysical Year (2007–2008), following 50 years after the International Geophysical Year; in adopting the term for this purpose, they expanded its meaning to encompass the entire domain of influence of the Sun (the heliosphere). As an early advocate of the newly expanded meaning, George Siscoe offered the following characterization:  "Heliophysics [encompasses] environmental science, a unique hybrid between meteorology and astrophysics, comprising a body of data and a set of paradigms (general laws—perhaps mostly still undiscovered) specific to magnetized plasmas and neutrals in the heliosphere interacting with themselves and with gravitating bodies and their atmospheres." 

Around 2007, Richard R. Fisher, then Director of the Sun-Earth Connections Division of NASA's Science Mission Directorate, was challenged by the NASA administrator to come up with a concise new name for his division that "had better end on 'physics'". He proposed "Heliophysics Science Division", which has been in use since then. The Heliophysics Science Division uses the term "heliophysics" to denote the study of the heliosphere and the objects that interact with it – most notably planetary atmospheres and magnetospheres, the solar corona, and the interstellar medium.

Heliophysical research connects directly to a broader web of physical processes that naturally expand its reach beyond NASA's narrower view that limits it to the Solar System: heliophysics reaches from solar physics out to stellar physics in general, and involves several branches of nuclear physics, plasma physics, space physics and magnetospheric physics. The science of heliophysics lies at the foundation of the study of space weather, and is also directly involved in understanding planetary habitability. This multitude of connections between heliophysics and (astro-)physical sciences is explored in a series of textbooks on heliophysics developed over more than a decade of NASA-funded Summer Schools for early-career researchers in the discipline.

See also 

 List of heliophysics missions
 Parker Solar Probe (was Solar Probe+)
 Solar and Heliospheric Observatory (SOHO)
 Solar Dynamics Observatory (SDO)
 STEREO
 Ulysses (spacecraft)
 Aeronomy
 Advanced Composition Explorer (ACE)
 WIND (spacecraft)
 Magnetospheric Multiscale Mission (MMS)
 Cluster II (spacecraft) (Cluster II)

References

External links
NASA Science Heliophysics
National Space Science Data Center

Sun
Space science
Articles containing video clips
Space weather